The Trade Union Council of South Africa (TUCSA) was a national trade union federation in South Africa.

History
The council was founded in October 1954 by 61 unions which split from the South African Trades and Labour Council.  They decided that only registered unions would be permitted to affiliate.  Because unions representing black workers were not permitted to register, this meant they were excluded from the council.  A few retained links with TUCSA affiliates, and established the parallel Federation of Free African Trade Unions of South Africa.  The federation was initially named the South African Trades Union Council.  In 1957, it affiliated to the new South African Confederation of Labour, which aimed to bring together all registered unions in the country, but it withdrew the following year, finding many of the other unions were explicitly white nationalist.  The experience led it to change its name to the "Trade Union Council of South Africa", to avoid any similarity of names with the confederation it had left.

In 1962, TUCSA changed its statues to allow "black unions" to affiliate, but in 1965 the Amalgamated Engineering Union of South Africa (AEU) disaffiliated in protest at this.  Two years later, the South African Typographical Union proposed splitting the council into two sections, one with registered unions only, and one with the more inclusive policy.  Instead, the thirteen black unions decided to disaffiliate, in order to prevent a split.  Many of the pro-government craft unions then followed the AEU in resigning, and faced with collapse, in 1969, TUCSA decided to once again restrict its membership to registered unions.  This led some craft unions to reaffiliate.

With TUCSA's African affairs section closed, some of its officials formed the Urban Training Project, to encourage black workers to form new unions.  From 1973, TUCSA recommended that its affiliates form parallel unions to represent black workers, but their weak position led independent black unions to argue that the parallel unions were simply puppets controlled by the registered unions, the registered unions hoping to preserve wage differentials and reduce militancy and political activism among black workers.

In 1974, TUCSA once again began admitting black unions, and some unions which had emerged from the Urban Training Project did join.  From 1979, unions were legally permitted to represent all workers, and several TUCSA affiliates began to do so.  In 1982, the council refused to join a general strike following the murder of Neil Aggett, and this led many unions to disaffiliate.  In December 1986, with 32 affiliates remaining but only 170,000 members, the council decided to dissolve.

Affiliates
In 1982, the following unions were affiliated:

General Secretaries
1954: Dulcie Hartwell
1962: Terence O'Donoghue
1965: Arthur Grobbelaar
1985: Position vacant

References

National trade union centres of South Africa
Trade unions established in 1954
Trade unions disestablished in 1986